The Dorothy H. Turkel House is a private residence located at 2760 West 7 Mile Road in north-central Detroit, Michigan, within the Palmer Woods neighborhood. It was designed by Frank Lloyd Wright and completed in 1956.

The Dorothy H. Turkel House is the only Wright-designed building within the city limits of Detroit. The spacious, two-story residence also represents a rare example of Usonian design, since the "Usonian Homes" were typically small, single-story dwellings. The house was purchased in 2006 by Norman Silk and Dale Morgan, who began restoration work on the house with former Wright apprentice, Lawrence R. Brink. The restoration was complete in 2010, at a reported cost of one million dollars.

Gallery

References

 Storrer, William Allin. The Frank Lloyd Wright Companion. University Of Chicago Press, 2006,  (S.388)

External links
Dorothy Turkel House
Library Street Collective web page of photographs using the Turkel house in an exhibition (December 16, 2020-February 13, 2021)

Frank Lloyd Wright buildings
Houses in Detroit
Houses completed in 1956
1956 establishments in Michigan